Marlon Kevin Alexander Richards (born 10 January 1989) is a Trinidadian cricketer who plays for the Trinidad and Tobago national team in West Indian domestic cricket. He is a right-handed batsman and right-arm medium-fast bowler.

Richards was born in Guyana, eventually moving with his family to Trinidad at the age of 12. He made his first-class debut for Trinidad and Tobago during the 2012–13 Regional Four Day Competition, and in the tournament semi-final against Jamaica took a maiden five-wicket haul, 5/46. In the 2014–15 Regional Four Day Competition, Richards took 27 wickets, with only Imran Khan taking more among his teammates.

References

External links
Player profile and statistics at CricketArchive
Player profile and statistics at ESPNcricinfo

1989 births
Living people
People from Linden, Guyana
Trinidad and Tobago cricketers
Trinidad and Tobago representative cricketers
Guyanese emigrants to Trinidad and Tobago
Trinbago Knight Riders cricketers